The 24th Annual GMA Dove Awards were held on April 1, 1993, recognizing accomplishments of musicians for the year 1992. The show was held in Nashville, Tennessee, and was hosted by Barbara Mandrell.

Award recipients

Artists
Artist of the Year
Steven Curtis Chapman
New Artist of the Year
Cindy Morgan
Group of the Year
4Him
Male Vocalist of the Year
Michael English
Female Vocalist of the Year
Twila Paris
Songwriter of the Year
Steven Curtis Chapman

Songs
Song of the Year
“The Great Adventure”; Steven Curtis Chapman, Geoff Moore
Rap/Hip Hop Recorded Song of the Year
"Can I Get A Witness"; Nu Thang; dc Talk
Rock Recorded Song of the Year
"Destiny"; Unseen Power; Petra
Pop/Contemporary Recorded Song of the Year
“The Great Adventure”; The Great Adventure; Steven Curtis Chapman
Hard Music Recorded Song of the Year
“Rattlesnake”; Snakes in the Playground; Bride
Southern Gospel Recorded Song of the Year
"There Rose a Lamb"; Pillars of Faith ; Gold City
Inspirational Recorded Song of the Year
"In Christ Alone"; Michael English; Michael English
Country Recorded Song of the Year
"If We Only Had the Heart"; Sometimes Miracles Hide; Bruce Carroll
Traditional Gospel Recorded Song of the Year
"T'Will Be Sweet"; Testimony; The Richard Smallwood Singers
Contemporary Gospel Recorded Song of the Year
"Real"; When the Music Stops; Daryl Coley

Albums
Rock Album of the Year
Pray for Rain; Pray for Rain
Pop/Contemporary Album of the Year
The Great Adventure; Steven Curtis Chapman
Rap/Hip Hop Album of the Year
Good News for the Bad Timez; Mike-E
Hard Music Album of the Year
Snakes in the Playground; Bride
Instrumental Album of the Year
Somewhere in Time; Dino
Praise & Worship Album of the Year
Coram Deo; Susan Ashton, Michael Card, Michael English, Out of the Grey, Charlie Peacock
Children's Music Album of the Year
Yo Kidz! Heroes, Stories, and Songs from the Bible; Carman
Musical Album
The Majesty and Glory of Christmas; Billy Ray Hearn and Tom Fettke
Choral Collection Album
Steven Curtis Chapman Choral Collection; Tom Hartley and Randy Smith
Recorded Music Packaging of the Year
Coram Deo; Larry Vigon; Denise Milford

Videos
Long Form Music Video of the Year
Addicted to Jesus; Carman
Short Form Music Video of the Year
"The Great Adventure"; Steven Curtis Chapman

References

GMA Music Awards
GMA Dove Awards
GMA Dove Awards
1993 in American music
GMA